Sazerac Company, Inc. is a privately held American alcoholic beverage company headquartered in Metairie in the metropolitan area of New Orleans, Louisiana, but with its principal office in Louisville, Kentucky. The company is owned by billionaire William Goldring and his family. , it operated nine distilleries, had 2,000 employees, and operated in 112 countries. It is one of the two largest spirits companies in the United States, with annual revenue of about $1 billion made from selling about 300 mostly discount brands.

History
The company was founded after the purchase of a bar known as the Sazerac Coffee House in 1869 by Thomas H. Handy. The coffee house itself had been established in 1850. After its purchase, Handy's company began to acquire and market brands of liquor. According to the company, the Sazerac Coffee House had been named after a cocktail called the Sazerac that was created in the mid-1800s by the immigrant Antoine Amédée Peychaud, who operated a pharmacy on Royal Street in the French Quarter of New Orleans in 1838. The company publishes a Sazerac recipe and produces a Peychaud's Bitters named after Peychaud, which is an ingredient in the traditional Sazerac cocktail.

William Goldring began buying shares of the company in 1984, and eventually purchased the entire company.

In 2009, the company's principal office was moved to Louisville, Kentucky, reflecting an increased company focus on bourbon whiskey production. However, the Sazerac Company still maintains an active presence in the New Orleans area, and it also has operations in Carson and Loomis, California; Baltimore, Maryland; Chicago, Illinois; Bardstown, Frankfort, and Owensboro, Kentucky; Fredericksburg, Virginia; Montreal, Quebec, Canada; Lewiston, Maine; Londonderry, New Hampshire; Newport, Tennessee; and Segonzac, France.

In 2016, the company had an estimated revenue of $1 billion per year and a market valuation estimate of $4.5 billion. The valuation placed Goldring in the Bloomberg Billionaires Index with an estimated net worth of $3.9 billion.

Distilleries
 A. Smith Bowman Distillery in Fredericksburg, Virginia
 Barton 1792 Distillery in Bardstown, Kentucky
 1820 Spirits Distillery in Lewiston, Maine
 Buffalo Trace Distillery in Frankfort, Kentucky
 Glenmore Distillery in Owensboro, Kentucky
 Les Distilleries Sazerac du Canada in Montreal, Quebec
 Popcorn Sutton Distillery in Newport, Tennessee
 Northwest Ordinance Distilling in New Albany, Indiana

Acquisitions
In 1989, Sazerac acquired several brands from Seagram: Benchmark, a bourbon, eventually changing its name from "Benchmark" to McAfee's Benchmark; James Foxe Canadian Whisky; Nikolai (vodka); Carstairs Blended Whiskey; Crown Russe, a vodka and gin brand; Dr. McGillicuddy's, a liqueur brand, that included its Fireball Whisky, which was rebranded as Fireball Cinnamon Whisky in 2007; Eagle Rare, a Kentucky straight bourbon whisky.

In 1992, Sazerac acquired the George T. Stagg Distillery in Frankfort, Kentucky, at which time the company's primary focus became the production of bourbon whiskey, a product that is primarily distilled, aged, and bottled in Kentucky, later changing its name to the Buffalo Trace Distillery in 1999.

In 1994, Sazerac acquired Monsieur Henri, a wine and specialty spirits company. In 2007, it was announced that they were changing the name Monsieur Henri to Gemini Spirits and Wine; it is headquartered in Loomis, California. In 2014, Sazerac announced the creation the Bond & Royal Company, located in Chicago, Illinois, to take over the specialty and craft segment of its brands from the Gemini Spirits and Wine portfolio including: Del Maguey Single Village Mezcal, a "cousin" to the tequila family of spirits, Campo de Encanto Pisco, a Peruvian brandy, Banks Rum, Siete Leguas Tequila, Glenfarclas Single Malt Scotch, Dimmi Liquore di Milano, an Italian liqueur, and the Casa San Matias Tequilas.

In 1999, Sazerac acquired the W.L. Weller bourbon brands.

In 2003, Sazerac acquired the A. Smith Bowman Distillery, located in Fredericksburg, Virginia. Virginia Gentleman, a bourbon whiskey, is distilled there.

In March 2009, Sazerac completed its acquisition of Constellation Brands value-priced spirit assets. The purchase included Barton Brands and several other bourbon brands, a distillery in Bardstown, Kentucky, and a bottling and warehousing facility in Owensboro, Kentucky. In June, Sazerac acquired The Old Taylor Bourbon label and barrel inventory from Beam Global Spirits & Wine, now known as Beam Suntory.

In September 2011, Sazerac entered into an agreement with Corby Distilleries Limited, to purchase 17 Corby owned brands including: McGuinness Silk Tassel Canadian Whisky, Red Tassel Vodka, and DeKuyper Geneva Gin and Peachtree Schnapps as part of the agreement made with the other brands acquired from Corby Distilleries Limited. The deal also included shares of Corby's manufacturing and bottling facilities in Montreal, Quebec, Canada and Quebec, Canada. The distillery was eventually renamed as the Old Montreal Distillery. In October, Sazerac Acquired 32 brands from White Rock Distillery, most notably: Tortilla triple sec, Desert Island cocktails, Kapali liqueurs, Ryans Irish cream liqueur, Fire Water schnapps liqueur, Ice 101 liqueurs, Barbarossa rum, Ice Box blenders and cocktails, Mount Royal Canadian whisky, and others. In May 2012, Sazerac Acquired several more brands from White Rock Distillery including: Baja Tequila, Tenure Vodka, Epic Vodka, Superia Vodka, Stroyski Vodka, El Charro Tequila, Blackmaker Root beer liqueur, and Chocolate Valley Vines wine.

In October 2012, Sazerac acquired Gran Gala, a liqueur brand, from Stock Spirits.

In October 2013, Sazerac bought a distillery, including land and equipment in Lewiston, Maine, from Beam Inc. (now known as Beam Suntory). By 2017, the name of the distillery was changed to Boston Brands of Maine. The Mr. Boston line of Brandies is distilled there.

In October 2015, Sazerac acquired Michael Collins, an Irish whiskey from the Sidney Frank Importing Company. Also in 2015, Sazerac added Van Gogh Imports, changing its name to 375 Park Avenue Spirits, as an independent, but fully integrated, division in its portfolio.

In March 2016, Sazerac completed the purchase of the Southern Comfort brand of whiskey-based liqueur, and Tuaca, a brandy liqueur, from Brown-Forman, Inc. That same month, Sazerac acquired Hi-Spirits to take over the distribution of its products in the UK. In May, it was announced that Sazerac had finalized a deal with Pernod Ricard's Irish Distillers to acquire its Paddy Whiskey brand. In September, Sazerac acquired The Last Drop Distillers, an independent bottler of Scotch whiskey. Also in September, Sazerac acquired South Trade International, an Australian spirit maker, from Pinnacle Drinks. In October, Sazerac acquired Frïs Vodka from Pernod Ricard. In December, Sazerac announced its acquisition of The Popcorn Sutton Distillery in Newport, Tennessee. Also in December, it was announced that Sazerac had acquired Domaine Breuil de Segonzac Cognac, including property located near the town of Segonzac, France, near Cognac.

In November 2018, Sazerac announced it would acquire 19 spirits brands from Diageo Plc, including Seagram VO Canadian whisky and Goldschläger cinnamon schnapps.

In June 2020, the company announced it would acquire the brands Early Times, Collingwood, and Canadian Mist, including the latter's distillery in Ontario, from Brown-Forman. The acquisition included the barrel aging stocks related to the different brands as well.

Joint ventures
In 2002, Sazerac entered an agreement with the Van Winkle family to produce its Pappy Van Winkle's Family Reserve and Old Rip Van Winkle bourbon and rye whisky brands at its Buffalo Trace Distillery.
In 2014, Sazerac entered into a licensing and distribution agreement with The Wine Group, to market its Big House Bourbon, Concannon Irish Whiskey, and Piedra Azul Tequila.
In 2015, Sazerac entered an agreement with La Martiniquaise to be a US distributor of its Saint-Vivant Armagnac brand, produced in France.
In 2016, Sazerac entered into an agreement with ArcusGruppen to be their US importer of its Lysholm Linie, Aalborg Taffel, and Aalborg Jubilaeums Aquavit brands produced in Norway.
On May 31, 2016, Sazerac entered a long-term Canadian national distribution agreement with Charton Hobbs, Inc. a wine and spirits company.
On March 3, 2017, it was announced that Sazerac entered a joint venture with Bittermens.
In June 2017, it was announced that Sazerac had entered agreement with Dictador, to have its Rum products be imported into the US through its 375 Spirits division.
In October 2017, it was announced that Sazerac entered an agreement with John Distilleries Private Limited (JDPL) to expand into India.

Divestitures
In June 2009, Sazerac sold Effen Vodka to Fortune Brands. After a restructuring of Fortune Brands and an acquisition by Suntory, Effen has since become a Beam Suntory brand.

See also

List of historic whisky distilleries

References

External links

 
Companies based in New Orleans
Bourbon whiskey
1850 establishments in Louisiana
Alcoholic drink companies
Distilleries